Cepphis decoloraria, the dark scallop moth, is a species of geometrid moth in the family Geometridae.

The MONA or Hodges number for Cepphis decoloraria is 6834.

References

Further reading

 

Ennominae
Articles created by Qbugbot
Moths described in 1886